Southern Zonal Council is a zonal council that comprises the states and union territories of Andhra Pradesh, Karnataka, Kerala, Puducherry, Tamil Nadu, and Telangana  

Andaman and Nicobar Islands, Lakshadweep are not members of any of the Zonal Councils. However, they are presently special invitees to the Southern Zonal Council.

The states of India have been grouped into six zones with an Advisory Council that aims to foster cooperation among these states. Five Zonal Councils were set up vide Part-III of the States Reorganisation Act, 1956.

See also 
 Northern Zonal Council
 North-Eastern Zonal Council
 Central Zonal Council
 Eastern Zonal Council
 Western Zonal Council

References

Zonal Councils